Niansanarie  is a commune of the Cercle of Djenné in the Mopti Region of Mali. The main village (chef-lieu) is Kéké.

References

External links
.

Communes of Mopti Region